Jac Jones (born 1 March 1943) is a Welsh children's book illustrator.

He was born in Gwalchmai, Anglesey and raised in Bristol until the age of 7, before returning to Gwalchmai. He was educated at Ysgol Gynradd Gwalchmai and Ysgol Uwchradd Llangefni.

Jones has illustrated children's books since the mid-1970s. He has won the Tir na n-Og Award for several books, including the 2009 Award for A Nod from Nelson by Simon Weston. In 2000, he wrote and illustrated a book in both Welsh and English – Betsan a’r Bwlis / Alison and the Bully Monsters. His illustration work includes Welsh works of note such as Penillion y Plant, Trysorfa by T. Llew Jones and many of Mary Vaughan Jones' titles and famous characters including Jac y Jwc.

Jones won the Mary Vaughan Jones Award in 2012.

References

External links 

 

1943 births
Living people
Welsh illustrators
Welsh children's writers
British children's book illustrators
People from Anglesey